Seroja may refer to:

 Cyclone Seroja
 Operation Seroja, the Indonesian invasion of East Timor